Bull Lea (March 11, 1935 – June 16, 1964) was an American Thoroughbred racehorse who is best known as the foundation sire responsible for making Calumet Farm one of the most successful racing stables in American history. In their article on Calumet Farm, the International Museum of the Horse in Lexington, Kentucky wrote that Bull Lea was "one of the greatest sires in Thoroughbred breeding history."

Background
Bred by E. Dale Schaffer's Coldstream Stud in Lexington, Kentucky, Bull Lea was sired by Bull Dog and out of the mare Rose Leaves by Ballot. He was purchased as a yearling for $14,000 by Calumet Farm's Warren Wright, Sr. and sent to race at age two under trainer Frank J. Kearns.

Racing career
Bull Lea make nine starts at age two, earning two wins, two seconds and two third-place finishes. The highlights were his runner-up performances in both the 1937 Hopeful and Champagne Stakes, two important races for his age group.

At age three, Bull Lea recorded seven wins from sixteen starts. He set a new Keeneland Race Course record for nine furlongs in winning the 1938 Blue Grass Stakes. Made a 3:1 second choice by bettors for the Kentucky Derby, he finished eighth and then ran sixth in the Preakness Stakes.

The following year, the four-year-old's most important win came in the Widener Handicap.

Stud record

Bull Lea entered stud in 1940 at Calumet Farm's operation in Lexington, Kentucky. He was the Leading sire in North America for 1947, 1948, 1949, 1952 and 1953. He also was Leading broodmare sire from 1958 to 1961. He was also the first sire in the history of American Thoroughbred horse racing to have offspring with earnings of more than $1 million in a single season.

Bull Lea sired fifty-eight stakes winners, seven of which are Hall of Fame members. His progeny includes:
 Armed (1941–1964): $817,475, U.S. Racing Hall of Fame inductee; 1947 U.S. Horse of the Year
 Twilight Tear (1941–1954): United States Racing Hall of Fame inductee; in 1944 she became the first filly to be voted U.S. Horse of the Year honors
 Faultless (1944): won 1947 Flamingo, Withers and Blue Grass Stakes plus the American Classic,  the Preakness Stakes
 Bewitch (1945–1959): $462,605, United States' Racing Hall of Fame inductee; 1947 U.S. Champion 2-Yr-Old Filly; 1949 U.S. Champion Older Female Horse
 Citation (1945–1970): $1,085,760, United States Racing Hall of Fame inductee;  1947 U.S. Champion 2-Yr-Old Colt; 1948 U.S. Triple Crown Champion, 1948 U.S. Horse of the Year; rated #3 - Top 100 U.S. Racehorses of the 20th Century
 Coaltown (1945–1965): $415,676, United States Racing Hall of Fame inductee; 1948 U.S. Champion Sprint Horse; 1949 Handicap Horse of the Year; 1949 Co-United States Horse of the Year; rated #47 - Top 100 U.S. Racehorses of the 20th Century
 Two Lea (1946–1973): United States' Racing Hall of Fame inductee, 1949 Co-Champion 3-Yr-Old Filly, 1950 U.S. Champion Older Female Horse
 Bull Page (1947): Canadian Horse Racing Hall of Fame inductee; 1951 Canadian Horse Of The Year
 Next Move (1947–1968): 1950 Champion 3-Yr-Old Filly; 1951 U.S. Champion Older Female Horse
 Hill Gail (1949–1968): won 1952 Santa Anita Derby, Kentucky Derby
 Mark-Ye-Well (1949–1970): multiple stakes winner including the Arlington Classic, American Derby, Lawrence Realization Stakes, Santa Anita Handicap
 Real Delight (1949–1969): 1952 Champion 3-Yr-Old Filly; 1952 U.S. Co-Champion Older Female Horse
 Gen. Duke (1954–1958): won Everglades Stakes, Florida Derby, Fountain of Youth Stakes
Iron Liege (1954–1972): won 1957 Kentucky Derby

Damsire of:
 Tim Tam (1955–1982): United States' Racing Hall of Fame inductee, won 1958 Kentucky Derby and Preakness Stakes
 Idun (1955): 1957 U.S. Champion 2-Yr-Old Filly; 1958 U.S. Champion 3-Yr-Old Filly
 Flaming Page (1959) : Canadian Horse Racing Hall of Fame inductee; won 1962 Queen's Plate; dam of English Triple Crown Champion, Nijinsky
 Gate Dancer (1981–1998): won 1984 Preakness Stakes

Grandsire of:
 Fabius (1953): won Preakness Stakes
 Silver Spoon (1956–1978): United States Racing Hall of Fame inductee; 1959 U.S. Co-Champion 3-Yr-Old Filly
 New Providence (1956–1981): Canadian Horse Racing Hall of Fame inductee; Canadian Triple Crown Champion

Bull Lea died on June 16, 1964, aged 29, at Calumet Farm and is buried there with a statue overlooking his grave.

Pedigree

References

1935 racehorse births
1964 racehorse deaths
Racehorses bred in Kentucky
Racehorses trained in the United States
United States Champion Thoroughbred Sires
American Champion Thoroughbred broodmare sires
Thoroughbred family 9-f
Chefs-de-Race